The Roman Catholic Archdiocese of Natal is an archdiocese located in the city of Natal in Brazil.

History
 December 29, 1909: Established as the Diocese of Natal from the Diocese of Paraíba
 February 16, 1952: Promoted as the Metropolitan Archdiocese of Natal

Bishops

Ordinaries, in reverse chronological order
 Archbishops of Natal (Roman rite), below
 Archbishop Jaime Vieira Rocha (since 2011.12.21)
 Archbishop Matias Patrício de Macêdo (2003.11.26 – 2011.12.21)
 Archbishop Heitor de Araújo Sales (1993.10.27 – 2003.11.26)
 Archbishop Alair Vilar Fernandes de Melo (1988.04.06 – 1993.10.27)
 Archbishop Nivaldo Monte (1967.09.06 – 1988.04.06)
 Archbishop Marcolino Esmeraldo de Souza Dantas (1952.02.16 – 1967.04.08)
 Bishops of Natal (Roman Rite), below
 Bishop Marcolino Esmeraldo de Souza Dantas (later Archbishop) (1929.03.01 – 1952.02.16)
 Bishop José Pereira Alves (1922.10.27 – 1928.01.27)
 Bishop Antônio dos Santos Cabral (1917.09.01 – 1921.11.21), appointed Bishop of Belo Horizonte; future Archbishop
 Bishop Joaquim Antônio d’Almeida (1910.10.23 – 1915.06.14)

Auxiliary bishops
Eugênio de Araújo Sales (1954-1964), appointed Apostolic Administrator of São Salvador da Bahia; future Cardinal
Antônio Soares Costa, appointed Bishop of Caruaru, Pernambuco in 1993

Other priests of this diocese who became bishops
José Tomas Gomes da Silva, appointed Bishop of Aracajú in 1911
Francisco Canindé Palhano, appointed Bishop of Bonfim, Bahia in 2006
Edilson Soares Nobre, appointed Bishop of Oeiras, Piaui in 2017

Suffragan dioceses
 Diocese of Caicó 
 Diocese of Mossoró

Sources
 GCatholic.org
 Catholic Hierarchy
  Archdiocese website (Portuguese)

Roman Catholic dioceses in Brazil
Roman Catholic ecclesiastical provinces in Brazil
 
Christian organizations established in 1909
Roman Catholic dioceses and prelatures established in the 20th century